. Not to be confused with Momin Ansari (Indian traditional weaving community).

Al-Ansari or Ansari is an Arab community, found predominantly in the Arab and South Asian countries. The meaning of the word 'Ansari' is supporter, the community are known as Ansari.

Historically, the community produced the sage, scholars and philosopher. The Ansari are an Urdu-speaking community, although the Ansari clan of Gujarat have Gujarati as their mother tongue.

Notable Ansaris

Medieval
Abu Ayyub al-Ansari, a prominent companion of Muhammad
Ansari ( other companions of Muhammad)
Sa'id ibn Aws al-Ansari (died 830), Arab linguist and narrator of hadith
Yaqub ibn Ibrahim al-Ansari (d.767), Hanafi Muslim Jurist and scholar
Abu al-Qasim al-Zahrawi (936–1013), also known as Albucasis, Arab Muslim physician and surgeon who lived in Al-Andalus
Alāʾ al‐Dīn ʿAlī ibn Ibrāhīm al-Ansari (1304–1375), also known as Ibn al-Shatir, prominent Arab astronomer and instruments maker.
Khwaja Abdullah Ansari (1006–1088), Perso-Arab mystic and poet, and one of the descendants of Abu Ayyub al-Ansari
Shams al-Din al-Ansari al-Dimashqi (1256–1327), Syrian Arab geographer
Zakariyya al-Ansari (1420–1520), Egyptian Sufi mystic

Modern
Khwaja Muhammad Latif Ansari, scholar and descendant of Khwaja Abdullah Ansari, the descendant of Abu Ayyub al-Ansari
Morteza Ansari (1781–1864), Shia jurist from Dezful, Iran
Muhammad Mian Mansoor Ansari (1879–1946), Indian freedom fighter, Hero of the Silken Letters Movement-1904-1916, diplomat, jurist, political scientist Deoband-India, Kabul-Afghanistan, Ankara-Turkey.
Abidullah Ghazi, (1936-), Indian-American Academician, syllabus developer, author, Chicago, Illinois, USA.
Rashid Ahmad Gangohi, (1839–1905). Indian Islamic scholar, jurist, academician, freedom fighter in 1857 War of Independence. Gangoh, Uttar Pradesh, India.
Abdulrahman al-Ansary, (b. 1935), Saudi Arabian archaeologist.
R

Naats in Islam

Tala' al Badru 'Alayna Tala‘ al-Badru ‘Alaynā is a traditional Islamic song known as nasheed that the Ansar sang to Muhammad upon his arrival at Yathrib after completing the Hijra in 622 CE. The naat is currently over 1400 years old, and one of the oldest in the Islam.

See also
 Islam in India
 Banu Khazraj
 Banu Aws
 Alawites
 Tala' al Badru 'Alayna
 Ansar (Islam)
 Brotherhood among the Sahabah

References

Further reading
 Ghazi, Muhammad Tariq Al-Ansari. "Tazkar ul Ansar" Biographical Encyclopedia (2018). Iqra Education Foundation, Mumbai, India (www.iqraindia.org).

Arabs
Muhajir communities
Punjabi tribes
Sindhi tribes
Social groups of Pakistan
Nisbas
Academicians